Botomotoito Skito Litimba (born 7 July 1977) is a Congolese former professional footballer who played as a forward for AS Vita Club, winning the Linafoot championship in 1997. In Germany, he played for LR Ahlen, SC Paderborn 07, 1. FC Bocholt and SV Straelen.

He was part of the Congolese 1998 African Nations Cup team, who finished in third place.

References

External links
 
 

1977 births
Living people
Footballers from Kinshasa
Association football forwards
Democratic Republic of the Congo footballers
Democratic Republic of the Congo international footballers
1998 African Cup of Nations players
2. Bundesliga players
AS Vita Club players
Rot Weiss Ahlen players
SC Paderborn 07 players
1. FC Bocholt players
SV 19 Straelen players
Democratic Republic of the Congo expatriate footballers
Expatriate footballers in Germany
Democratic Republic of the Congo expatriate sportspeople in Germany
21st-century Democratic Republic of the Congo people